The Stone County School District is a public school district based in Wiggins, Mississippi (USA). The district's boundaries parallel that of Stone County.

Schools
Stone High School
Stone Middle School
Stone Elementary School
Perkinston Elementary School

Demographics

2006-07 school year
There were a total of 2,803 students enrolled in the Stone County School District during the 2006–2007 school year. The gender makeup of the district was 49% female and 51% male. The racial makeup of the district was 24.40% African American, 74.56% White, 0.39% Hispanic, 0.43% Asian, and 0.21% Native American. 43.6% of the district's students were eligible to receive free lunch.

Previous school years

Accountability statistics

See also
List of school districts in Mississippi

References

External links

Education in Stone County, Mississippi
School districts in Mississippi
School districts established in 1957
1957 establishments in Mississippi